Edward Feld, born 1943, is a conservative rabbi and author. He was the senior editor of the conservative Rabbinical Assembly's High Holiday maḥzor Maḥzor Lev Shalem (2010), which was the first conservative Jewish liturgical publication to include passages aimed at the needs of gay couples. Feld currently serves as the Senior Editor of the Rabbinical Assembly's   Shabbat and festivals prayer book Siddur Lev Shalem, (2016) a follow-up to the maḥzor preceding it, similarly laced with commentaries and contemporarily-sensitive alternative textual options.

Feld's other works include The Spirit of Jewish Renewal: Finding Faith After the Holocaust (Jewish Lights Publishing: 2003), Joy, Despair, and Hope: Reading Psalms (Cascade Books: 2013), and many articles, including "Towards an Aggadic Judaism" (Conservative Judaism Journal: 29, 3; 1975).

Rabbi Feld is married to educator, activist, playwright, poet and author Merle Feld, and the two have a daughter, Lisa, and a son, Uri.

References

Conservative rabbis
1943 births
Place of birth missing (living people)
Living people